Latirus maculatus is a species of sea snail, a marine gastropod mollusc in the family Fasciolariidae, the spindle snails, the tulip snails and their allies.

Subspecies

 Latirus maculatus var. concinna Tapparone-Canefri, 1880: synonym of Latirus concinnus Tapparone-Canefri, 1880

Description
The length of the shell attains 31.8 mm.

Distribution
This marine species occurs off French Polynesia.

References

 Hombron, J.B. & Jacquinot, C.H. (1842-1854). Atlas d'histoire Naturelle zoologie par MM. Hombron et Jacquinot, chirurgiens de l'expédition. Voyage au Pole Sud et dans l'Océanie sur les corvettes l'Astrolabe et la Zélée éxecuté par ordre du roi pendant les années 1837–1838–1839–1840 sous le commandement de M. Dumont-d'Urville, capitaine de vaisseau, publié sous les auspices du département de la marine et sous la direction supérieure de M. Jacquinot, capitaine de vaisseau, commandant de la Zélée. Zoologie. Gide & Cie, Paris.

External links
 Reeve, L. A. (1847). Monograph of the genus Turbinella. In: Conchologia Iconica, or, illustrations of the shells of molluscous animals, vol. 4, pl. 1-13 and unpaginated text. L. Reeve & Co., London.
 Tapparone Canefri, C. (1881). Glanures dans la faune malacologique de l'Ile Maurice. Catalogue de la famille des Muricidés. 100 pp., 2 pls.

Fasciolariidae
Gastropods described in 1847